East Devon Area of Outstanding Natural Beauty (AONB) covers over  of the East Devon countryside (England).

This countryside includes eighteen miles (29 km) of Heritage coastline. The designated area covers: twenty-nine parishes and borders the coastal towns of Exmouth, Seaton and Sidmouth but includes the entire resort of Budleigh Salterton.

East Devon has two AONBs within its catchment area which includes the Blackdown Hills (designated 1991) and East Devon AONB (designated 1963), both AONBs make up over 66% of the district.

East Devon AONB Partnership is a joint initiative funded by Defra (Department for Environment, Food and Rural Affairs), East Devon District Council and Devon County Council.  Through ventures such as community projects and project grants East Devon AONB Partnership helps to conserve and manage the East Devon AONB.

External links
 East Devon AONB Website
 BBC Review of Heritage Coastal Walk

1963 establishments in England
East Devon District
Areas of Outstanding Natural Beauty in England
Environment of Devon
Organisations based in Devon
Protected areas of Devon
Protected areas established in 1963